The 1981 Gilbey's Gin season was the third season of the franchise in the Philippine Basketball Association (PBA). The team were known as St. George Whisky in the Reinforced Filipino Conference.

Transactions

Imports
The high-scoring Larry McNeill return for the third straight season with Gilbey's in the Open Conference and along with Dean Tolson, who was also back when he first played together with McNeill as imports for the La Tondeña ballclub in its maiden year in 1979. 

In the Reinforced Filipino Conference, the team signed up Kenny Tyler as their import.  Tyler played for the visiting Nicholas Stoodley squad from United States that won the Invitational championship last season.

Won-loss record vs Opponents

Roster

References

Barangay Ginebra San Miguel seasons
Gilbey's Gin